Mysterium is the sixteenth studio album by American heavy metal band Manilla Road. It was released on February 1, 2013 in on both Golden Core-ZYX and Shadow Kingdom Records in CD format and on High Roller Records in LP format.

Track listing
 "The Grey God Passes" - 4:05
 "Stand Your Ground" - 2:57
 "The Battle Of Bonchester Bridge" - 4:29
 "Hermitage" - 6:02
 "Do What Thou Will" - 4:09
 "Only The Brave" - 3:37
 "Hallowed Be Thy Grave" - 4:37
 "The Fountain" - 4:28
 "The Calling" - 4:00
 "Mysterium" - 11:21

Personnel
 Mark Shelton – guitars, vocals
 Bryan Patrick – vocals 
 Andreas Neuderth – drums
 Josh Castillo – bass

References

Manilla Road albums
2013 albums